Albert Bauer (June 6, 1928 – April 21, 2021) was an American politician in the American state of Washington.

Bauer was born in Lewistown, Montana and attended Clark Community College, Portland State College, and Oregon State University. A Navy veteran, he was a teacher before entering politics. Bauer was elected to the Washington House of Representatives in 1971 to the 49th district, and served until 1980, when he ran for the state senate. In the  latter three years, he served as the House Democratic Caucus Chairman. He served in the Washington State Senate from 1981 to 2001 as a Democrat representing the 48th district. From 1999 to 2001, he was Senate Vice President Pro Tempore.

Bauer was married to Patricia and has three children. Bauer Hall at Clark College is named in his honour. He has received many awards, including the  Washington State School Principals’ Legislator of the Year Award, Mother Joseph Legislative Award, Betty Sharff Memorial Award, HOSTS Corporation, Personal Commitment to Improve Education, Phi Delta Kappa Award, Bauer Hall, and the Washington State Educational Service District’s Walter G. Turner Award.

He died of a stroke on April 21, 2021, in Vancouver, Washington, at age 92.

References

1928 births
2021 deaths
People from Lewistown, Montana
Military personnel from Washington (state)
Democratic Party members of the Washington House of Representatives
Portland State University alumni
Oregon State University alumni
Democratic Party Washington (state) state senators
American educators